The 1st Louisiana Regular Battery was an artillery unit recruited from volunteers in Louisiana that fought in the Confederate States Army during the American Civil War. The battery was accepted into Confederate service in October 1861. The battery fought at Baton Rouge in August 1862, then it transferred to the west bank of the Mississippi River and fought at Georgia Landing in October. In 1863, it fought at Fort Bisland and Vermillion Bayou. The battery was attached to Tom Green's Texas cavalry brigade for the remainder of the year and fought at Second Donaldsonville. In 1864, the battery did not come into action at Mansfield and Pleasant Hill, but it fought at Mansura and Yellow Bayou. The battery was at Tyler, Texas, at the end of the conflict.

See also
List of Louisiana Confederate Civil War units
Louisiana in the Civil War

Notes

References
 
 

 

Units and formations of the Confederate States Army from Louisiana
1861 establishments in Louisiana
Military units and formations established in 1861
1865 disestablishments in Louisiana
Military units and formations disestablished in 1865